Yunt Mountains are in western Anatolia, Aegean Region of Turkey.

Geography

They are a mountain range and located in İzmir and Manisa provinces of Turkey. They are near the districts of Soma, Kınık, Kırkağaç and Bergama.

History
According to ancient time geographer Strabon, the name of the Yunt Mountains in old times were Aspordenon. Aigai, one of the twelve cities of ancient Aeolis is on the Yunt Mountains in modern Manisa province. Gambrion and Paleogambrion cities, which are mentioned in Anabasis of Xenephon, are on the Yunt Mountains near Bergama and Kınık districts. In the Hellenistic Period, Philetairos, who was the founder of Pergamon Kingdom and Attalid Dynasty, built a sanctuary dedicated to Magna Mater, Kybele on the Yunt Mountains near Kınık district.

Footnotes

References 
Strabon, Geography, (Books: XII,XIII,XIV)
Esther V.Hansen, The Attalids of Pergamon, Cornell University Press, 1971
Sefa Taşkın, Pergamon Kadınları,Arkeoloji ve Sanat Yayınları, 2011

Mountain ranges of Turkey
Aegean Region
Landforms of İzmir Province
Landforms of Manisa Province